= Andralu =

Village in Karnataka, India

Coordinates: 31°52′N 76°50′E

Andralu is a village just south of Ballari in the southern state of Karnataka, India.

== See also ==
- Bellary
- Districts of Karnataka
